ABC Rural was a department of the Australian Broadcasting Corporation that produced news, business, and entertainment programs targeted at audiences in regional Australia. The department employed 70 staff and reporters around the country. In 2015, the Rural department was rolled into the ABC's Regional division as part of a restructure of the organisation. The Rural department continues to operate as part of the ABC's Regional and Local division, with Rural Reporters stationed in most of the regional offices and Country Hour executive producers and presenters in each capital city. The ABC Rural website (http://www.abc.net.au/rural) also continues to operate as a portal to all of the corporation's farming, agriculture and mining news.

History
The history of the Rural department can be traced back to 1945, when moves were made to formalise the provision of specialist rural news and information on ABC Radio. Although the ABC had provided specialist information to regional audiences (such as markets and rainfall figures), the head of the new department, John Douglass, established a new program titled The Country Hour, first broadcast on December 3, 1945.

Dick Snedden was the original host, known to viewers in New South Wales for his reporting of the Sydney Show. Announcers were later appointed in other capital cities, to provide state-level news and information (all the while contributing to the national portion of the program). The Country Hour was later presented separately for each state.

In 1951, regional 'extension officers' were appointed to some areas undertake interviews and cover local stories. Following the 1956 introduction of television to more densely populated areas, a number of television programs were launched - To Market To Market, A Big Country, Countrywide and Landline all debuted in subsequent years. The titles of extension officers were changed in the 1980s to 'rural reporters', and their supervisors 'executive producers'. Their roles however, remained almost identical.

In 1990, Executive Producer of the Rural Department in Western Australia, Tom Murrell, appointed and trained the ABC's first indigenous rural reporter, Frank Walsh, who was brought up in Mount Magnet in the Murchison region of Western Australia. 

An 'online gateway' was launched as part of the ABC's website in 1999 at http://www.abc.net.au/rural, offering news, and streaming audio and video.

Programming

Radio
 The Country Hour - ABC Local Radio
 Bush Telegraph - Radio National, Radio Australia
 Country Breakfast - Radio National
 Rural Reporter - Radio National, ABC Local Radio
 Resources Beat - ABC NewsRadio
 Mining and Resources
 Heywire- ABC Local Radio, Radio National, Triple J, Radio Australia, ABC TV

Television
 Landline - ABC TV

See also
 Australian Broadcasting Corporation
 ABC Radio and Regional Content
 ABC Television

References

External links
 ABC Rural Programs
 Bush Telegraph web site
 The Country Hour web site
 A brief history of the ABC Rural Department

Australian Broadcasting Corporation divisions
Rural organisations in Australia